A Moonless Night is a 2014 Uruguayan-Argentine drama film directed by Germán Tejeira. The film was selected as the Uruguayan entry for the Best Foreign Language Film at the 88th Academy Awards but it was not nominated.

Cast
 Roberto Suárez as Antonio
 Daniel Melingo as Molgota
 Marcel Keoroglian as César
 Elisa Gagliano as Laura

See also
 List of submissions to the 88th Academy Awards for Best Foreign Language Film
 List of Uruguayan submissions for the Academy Award for Best Foreign Language Film

References

External links
 

2014 films
2014 drama films
Argentine drama films
2010s Spanish-language films
Uruguayan drama films
Films set in Uruguay
2010s Argentine films